Bedson Ridge is a ridge in the Rocky Mountains located in Alberta, Canada.

Bedson Ridge most likely has the name of a Manitoba prison warden.

References

Ridges of Alberta